Sphodros is a genus of North American purseweb spiders first described by Charles Athanase Walckenaer in 1835. It was considered a synonym of Atypus until 1980.

Species

 it contains seven species in the United States, Canada, and Mexico:
Sphodros abboti Walckenaer, 1835 (type) – Southern Georgia, Northern Florida
Sphodros atlanticus Gertsch & Platnick, 1980 – Eastern and Central United States
Sphodros coylei Gertsch & Platnick, 1980 – South Carolina, Virginia
Sphodros fitchi Gertsch & Platnick, 1980 – Nebraska, Kansas, Oklahoma, Arkansas, Iowa
Sphodros niger (Hentz, 1842) – Canada, Northeastern United States (south to Tennessee and east to Kansas)
Sphodros paisano Gertsch & Platnick, 1980 – Southeastern Texas, Mexico
Sphodros rufipes (Latreille, 1829) – Southeastern United States (east from Texas)

References

Atypidae
Mygalomorphae genera
Spiders of North America
Taxa named by Charles Athanase Walckenaer